Cécile Huguenin is a French psychologist and life coach. She made her literary debut in 2011 with an acclaimed memoir titled Alzheimer mon amour. At the age of seventy-four, she published her debut novel La Saison des mangues. It won the Prix Alain Fournier. Her second novel Passages du désir appeared in 2017.

References

French women writers
Living people
Year of birth missing (living people)
French women psychologists
French memoirists
French novelists